Loving Mary or Loving Mary Band is a band of well known singers and musicians and songwriters. The group's sound has been described as a combination of Americana, country, and rock n' roll.

In 2013, Suzie McNeil began working on a duo project with previous songwriting collaborator Marti Frederiksen, which was reportedly intended to follow in the style of American country trio Lady Antebellum. Instead, in 2014 the two teamed up with Grammy-winning country singer Rebecca Lynn Howard and Andrew Mactaggart, Sarah Tomek and husband, songwriter Elisha Hoffman to form the band Loving Mary, which they envisioned as a sort of modern-day Fleetwood Mac. 

An EP, Loving Mary – Live, was recorded and released in early 2015, Loving Mary released its debut album Little Bit of Love in 2016.

Touring
The group joined Aerosmith's Steven Tyler as backup band on his debut country solo studio album We're All Somebody from Somewhere and its supporting "Out On A Limb" tour in the U.S. and Japan. The band has made numerous appearances with Tyler on the festival circuit, including WE Fest and The Pilgrimage Music Festival, as well as on The Tonight Show Starring Jimmy Fallon, The Ellen DeGeneres Show, and The TODAY Show.

In 2017, Loving Mary joined Gretchen Wilson on a multi-city tour in support of her album Ready to Get Rowdy.

Discography

Albums
2016:  Little Bit of Love

EPs
2015: Loving Mary – Live

References

External links
Official website

Country music groups
Musical groups established in 2014
2014 establishments in the United States